Still Wanted is the fourteenth album by rapper Luni Coleone, released in conjunction with rapper Hollow Tip. It was released on May 16, 2006 for Out of Bounds Records and was produced by Luni Coleone, Big Hollis and Larry Funk. Still Wanted was the follow-up to the duos 2002 album, Wanted Dead or Alive.

Track listing
"Home Run"- 0:42  
"My Name"- 3:43  
"Why"- 4:31  
"I'll Smoke Anybody"- 1:01  
"Grab Dat Cannon" (featuring Big Hollis) - 4:32
"The Streets Is Watchin'"- 3:50  
"Kick It"- 0:29 
"Keep Me Comin' 2 You"- 3:53  
"Hold Me Down" (featuring Mac Gee) - 4:51  
"Woodgrain" (featuring Young Savage & Lace Leno) - 5:09  
"I Want 2 Meet You"- 4:07  
"Get off Me" (Skit)- 0:04  
"Get off Me"- 3:51  
"Gangsta Till I Die" (featuring Big Hollis) - 4:37  
"Miss Purdy"- 1:07

2006 albums
Luni Coleone albums
Albums produced by Big Hollis